The 2011–12 NBB Cup was the 44th season of the Dutch NBB Cup. The championship game was played in the Topsportcentrum (Almere). Zorg en Zekerheid Leiden won the cup, Magixx playing for KidsRights was the runner-up.

Bracket

Final

References

NBB Cup
NBB Cup